Peter John Milton Whipp (born 22 September 1950) was a South African rugby union player.

Playing career
Whipp made his provincial debut for Western Province in the Currie Cup match against South Western Districts at Mossel Bay in 1971. He went on to gain 71 caps over a ten-year period for Western Province.

He made his international debut on 8 June 1974 against the British Lions on his home ground of Newlands in Cape Town. He played eight test matches and scored his only international try against France on 21 June 1975 in Bloemfontein. Whipp also played in two tour matches for the Springboks. His career was brought to a premature end in 1981 when he suffered a severe injury.

Test history

See also
List of South Africa national rugby union players – Springbok no. 459

References

External links
Peter Whipp on genslin.us

1950 births
Living people
Villager FC players
South African rugby union players
South Africa international rugby union players
Rugby union centres
Rugby union players from the Eastern Cape